Wola Zadybska  is a village in the administrative district of Gmina Kłoczew, within Ryki County, Lublin Voivodeship, in eastern Poland.

The village has a population of 340.

References

Wola Zadybska